"Wheels Ain't Coming Down" is a song by the British rock band Slade, released in 1979 as the opening track from their eighth studio album Return to Base. The song was written by lead vocalist Noddy Holder and bassist Jim Lea, and produced by Slade. In 1981, the song re-appeared on the band's follow-up album We'll Bring the House Down and was released as the second single from it in March, which reached No. 60 in the UK.

Background
"Wheels Ain't Coming Down" was released as the opening track on Return to Base, which was a commercial failure in 1979; a period when the band's popularity was low. The song also appeared on the 1980 extended play Six of the Best, which also failed to chart. In 1980, the band's fortunes were revived after a performance at Reading Festival. To capitalise on the new interest in the band, the album We'll Bring the House Down was released in March 1981, which featured a number of tracks re-used from Return to Base, including "Wheels Ain't Coming Down". Following up the Top Ten hit "We'll Bring the House Down", the band decided to release "Wheels Ain't Coming Down" as a single in March 1981. It reached No. 60, lasting three weeks on the chart.

"Wheels Ain't Coming Down" tells the tale of a near-death flying experience suffered by Holder and Lea when travelling to Los Angeles. In a 1981 interview with Daily Star, Holder recalled: "Jim and I were on the way to a radio station when the captain told us he could not get the wheels down to land. We were diverted to another airport for a crash landing. It's not a great feeling knowing you might have only 45 minutes left in life. We drank all the booze there was going. Happily the pilot brought the plane down safely."

Release
"Wheels Ain't Coming Down" was released on 7" vinyl by Cheapskate in the UK only. The first 20,000 copies of the single were issued with a picture sleeve. The B-side, "Not Tonight Josephine", was previously the B-side to the 1979 single "Sign of the Times".

Music video
A music video was filmed, however it was never shown at the time of single's release. It was directed by Eric Boliski. The video was filmed on the afternoon of 10 March 1981 at the Southampton Gaumont, prior to the band's concert there that evening.
Fans of the band first saw the video on a bootleg DVD that was produced as part of the 'One More Time' DVD. Uber fans Mark Richards and Steve Knight forwarded the Video tape on to Slade In England where David Graham re edited and cleaned up the VHS tape. A DVD was produced and distributed amongst those Slade fans in the know.

Critical reception
In a review of Return to Base, Wolverhampton Express and Star described the song as a "power-packed churning song with a catchy hook line". Geoff Ginsberg of AllMusic ranked the song among the band's best work. He described it as "infectious to the degree that humming [it] could become a chronic problem".

Upon release as a single in 1981, Record Mirror felt the song had an "uncharacteristic musical sophistication" for Slade. Sounds described it as "dull, heavy-handed melodrama", adding there is "lots of whizz-bang sound effects but precious little inspiration". New Musical Express said the song was a disappointing follow-up to "We'll Bring the House Down": "After a few hearings you realise it's just plain bad". Melody Maker said the song was "more tautly constructed" than its predecessor and "not so insanely vigorous". They added that the chorus is "maddeningly infectious".

Track listing
7" Single
"Wheels Ain't Coming Down" – 3:37
"Not Tonight Josephine" – 3:03

Chart performance

Personnel
Noddy Holder – lead vocals, rhythm guitar, producer, arranger
Dave Hill – lead guitar, backing vocals, producer, arranger
Jim Lea – bass, backing vocals, producer, arranger
Don Powell – drums, producer, arranger

References

1981 singles
Slade songs
Songs written by Noddy Holder
Songs written by Jim Lea
1979 songs
Song recordings produced by Jim Lea
Song recordings produced by Noddy Holder
Song recordings produced by Dave Hill
Song recordings produced by Don Powell